Albania first participated at the Summer Olympic Games in 1972. They missed the next four games, three of them for political reasons due to the 1980 Summer Olympics boycott, 1984 Summer Olympics boycott and 1988 boycotts, but returned for the Barcelona 1992 Summer Olympics. They have appeared in all games since then. They made their Winter Olympic Games debut in 2006. Albania normally competes in events that include swimming, athletics, weightlifting, shooting, and wrestling. The country has not yet won an Olympic medal. Along with Bosnia and Herzegovina, Andorra and Monaco, Albania is one of four current European participants that have never won an Olympic medal. They have been represented by the Albanian National Olympic Committee since 1972.

History 
Albania first competed at the Munich 1972 Summer Olympics with five participants over two events; Fatos Pilkati and Afërdita Tusha in the mixed 50 metre free pistol, Ismail Rama and Beqir Kosova in the mixed 50 metre rifle, prone, and Ymer Pampuri in the men's 60 kg weightlifting. who in the 1972 Summer Olympic Games became the first Albanian to break an Olympic record, in military press, since the discipline was no longer allowed to be practiced internationally after 1972 In the 1992 Barcelona Summer Olympics: Alma Qeramixhi competed in the heptathlon; Kristo Robo in the 25 metre rapid fire pistol; Enkelejda Shehu in the 25 metre pistol; Frank Leskaj in the 50 metre freestyle, 100 metre freestyle, and 100 metre breaststroke; Sokol Bishanaku and Fatmir Bushi in the under 67.5 kg weightlifting; and Dede Dekaj in the under 110 kg weightlifting. For the 1996 Summer Olympics in Atlanta, Albania had seven athletes—4 female and 3 male. Mirela Manjani were the flag bearer for the Olympic Games in that year. At the 2000 Summer Olympics in Sydney, Albania's delegation consisted of two male and two female athletes. They had seven competitors (two female, five male) in the Athens 2004 Summer Olympics. In Beijing at the 2008 Summer Olympics, the nation had eleven athletes (four female and seven male). For the London 2012 Summer Olympics, Albania had nine athletes consisting of three women and six men. Romela Begaj the flag bearer for Albania at the 2012 Summer Olympics would compete in Weightlifting at the 2012 Summer Olympics – Women's 58 kg category finishing in 9th at the end, after lifting 216 kg in total. Briken Calja would achieve the best result for Albania at the 2012 Summer Olympics in which he would finish 6th in Weightlifting at the 2012 Summer Olympics – Men's 69 kg after lifting 320 kg.

Briken Calja competed at the 2016 Summer Olympics in the 69kg division where he finished in 5th place after lifting 326 kg.

Birken Calja would compete at the following 2020 Summer Olympics in the 73kg division. The European Weightlifting champion in 2018 would finish in 4th after lifting. It would be the best result in the History for Albania at the Summer Olympics.

In the 2020 Summer Olympics Luiza Gega wrote history for Albania. As she would be the first athlete from Albania, to qualify for the finals in Athletics at the Summer Olympics. After she finished 5th in Athletics at the 2020 Summer Olympics – Women's 3000 metres steeplechase with a time of 9:23.85 in the end enough to progress to the finals. At the final run, she would finish in 13th.

 Albania has no Olympic medalists.

Medalists from Albania at the Olympic Games 
Albania remains without a medal win, although Albanians competing for different nations would win medals in other Olympic Games: 
 Mirela Manjani competed for Albania at the 1996 Summer Olympics in Atlanta, but chose to represent Greece in Javelin throw at the 2000 Summer Olympics in Sydney, winning silver, as well as bronze at the 2004 Games. 
 Kosovo Albanian Luan Krasniqi who is born in Junik won the bronze medal representing Germany at Heavyweight boxing in the 1996 Summer Olympics in Atlanta. 
 Fatmire Alushi born in Istog from Kosovo winning for the Germany women's national football team the bronze medal in Football at the 2008 Summer Olympics in Beijing. She is also the first Kosovo Albanian women to win a medal in Football at the Summer Olympics. 
 Kosovare Asllani with Kosovo Albanian descent competed for Sweden at the Summer Olympics in Football. She would win twice silver first in 2016 and in the following Women's tournament in Tokyo 2020. She is the first Kosovo Albanian female to win silver medals in Football at the Summer Olympics for her Country.
 Majlinda Kelmendi a Judoka born in Peja, Kosovo. She would compete for Albania at the 2012 Summer Olympics in Judo. Majlinda would choose Kosovo at the 2016 Summer Olympics in which she would win Gold in Judo at the 2016 Summer Olympics – Women's 52 kg after beating Odette Giuffrida in the final, to win Kosovo's first ever medal at the Summer Olympics.
 Distria Krasniqi is a Judoka from Kosovo but with Albanian ethnicity, who competed for Kosovo at the 2020 Summer Olympics. She would compete in Judo at the 2020 Summer Olympics – Women's 48 kg category. In the finals she would beat Funa Tonaki to win the second gold medal ever for Kosovo. 
 Nora Gjakova is a Judoka from Kosovo. She would make her debut in Judo at the 2020 Summer Olympics – Women's 57 kg in which she would Gold in the finals against Sarah-Léonie Cysique to secure the final Medal for Kosovo at the 2020 Summer Olympics held in Tokio.

There were plenty of ethnic Albanians who did compete for Yugoslavia at the Summer Olympics and would win medals in various sport competitions as well:
 Shaban Tërstena was an Albanian wrestler who represented Yugoslavia at the 1984 Summer Olympics and 1988 Summer Olympics. He won the gold medal at the 1984 Olympics in Los Angeles and also won the silver medal at the 1988 Olympics in Seoul. Being the most successful Wrestler for Yugoslavia, at the Summer Olympics. He was also declared the best athlete of Yugoslavia in 1984 being the second ethnic Albanian to achieve this feet, after Sejdiu did in 1977.
 Aziz Salihu competing in boxing for Yugoslavia at the 1984 Summer Olympics winning the bronze medal in Super heavyweight.
 Shaban Sejdiu is an Albanian Wrestler who competed for Yugoslavia in the Olympics. He would win twice Bronze in the Summer Olympics. First at the 1980 Summer Olympics held in  Moscow. He would win again Bronze at the 1984 Summer Olympics in Los Angeles. Being the first ethnic Albanian to win multiple medals, for Yugoslavia at the Olympics.

In total the Albanian athletes winning 14 Medals at the Summer Olympics in which of them being four gold, two silver and six bronze medals in various sports competitions, for several different countries, in the history.

Medal tables

Medals by Summer Olympics

Medals by Winter Olympics

Flagbearers

See also
 Sports in Albania
 Albania at the Mediterranean Games
 List of participating nations at the Summer Olympic Games
 List of participating nations at the Winter Olympic Games
 :Category:Olympic competitors for Albania
 Albania at the Paralympics

References

External links